CK Entertainments Private Limited is an Indian film production company established by C Kalyan, an Indian film producer. The company is based in Hyderabad.Telugu movies produced by the company Jyothi Lakshmi, Loafer and Jai Simha.

Production company and success
C Kalyan established CK Entertainments Private Limited in 2011. The first movie that was made under the banner was Chandrakala directed by Sundar C In 2015 Jyothi Lakshmi directed by Puri Jagannadh. In 2015, they made another film Loafer under the direction of Puri Jagannadh. In 2017, they made Jai Simha under the direction of K. S. Ravikumar and released the movie on 2018 Pongal. In 2017 they are also made Intelligent under the direction of V. V. Vinayak and released in February 2018.

Film Production

References

External links 

 

Indian film studios
Film production companies based in Hyderabad, India
2011 establishments in Andhra Pradesh